Bagn is the administrative centre of Sør-Aurdal Municipality in Innlandet county, Norway. The river Begna runs through the village on its way through the Valdres region. The European route E16 highway passes through the village on its way between Bergen and Oslo.

Bagn Church is located in the village. The Valdrestunet mall and the Bagn Bygdesamling museaum are both located in the area as well. During World War II, there were some major battles in the Bagn area in April of 1940, with a national memorial site at Bagnsbergatn.

References

Sør-Aurdal
Villages in Innlandet